Matt Alrich (born August 28, 1981) is a  professional lacrosse player for the Baltimore Bombers in the North American Lacrosse League, and the Rochester Rattlers of Major League Lacrosse.

Alrich is a graduate of University of Delaware.  As a senior, he was named the team's Most Valuable Player and first team All Colonial Athletic Conference.

Alrich originally played with the Baltimore Bayhawks of the Major League Lacrosse, prior to being drafted by the San Francisco Dragons in the 2006 MLL Expansion Draft.  Prior to the 2008 MLL season, he was traded to the Boston Cannons.    He was claimed in the 2010 Supplemental Draft prior to the 2011 season by the Rochester Rattlers.

The San Jose Stealth drafted Alrich in the Third Round (24th overall) in the 2004 National Lacrosse League entry draft. In late 2006, he was traded to the New York Titans along with Ryan Boyle.

Statistics

Major League Lacrosse

National Lacrosse League

University of Delaware

See also
University of Delaware Mens Lacrosse

References

1981 births
Living people
American lacrosse players
Delaware Fightin' Blue Hens men's lacrosse players
Major League Lacrosse players
New York Titans (lacrosse) players
Orlando Titans players
Rochester Rattlers players
San Jose Stealth players